Micardia is a genus of moths of the family Noctuidae.

Species
Micardia argentata Butler, 1878 (from China, North Korea and Japan)
Micardia argentoidea Berio, 1954 (from Madagascar)
Micardia distincta Chen & Xue, 2012 (from China (Sichuan))
Micardia ikoly Viette, 1982 (from Madagascar)
Micardia itremo Viette, 1982 (from Madagascar)
Micardia minuta Chen & Xue, 2012 (from China (Yunnan))
Micardia munda Leech, 1900 (from China and Myanmar)
Micardia pallens Chen & Xue, 2012 (from China (Hubei))
Micardia pulcherrima (Moore, 1867) (from Bhutan, China (Tibet), India)
Micardia pulchra Butler, 1878
Micardia quadrilinea Scriba, 1921
Micardia simplicissima Berio, 1973 (from Madagascar)
Micardia terracottoides Berio, 1954 (from Madagascar)

References
Chen & Xue, 2012. A review of Micardia Butler, 1878 from China. Zootaxa 3417:45-52
Natural History Museum Lepidoptera genus database

Acontiinae